Uzundere is a village in the Hasankeyf District of Batman Province in Turkey. The village is populated by Kurds from different tribal background including the Reman tribe and had a population of 138 in 2021.

References 

Villages in Hasankeyf District
Kurdish settlements in Batman Province